Linoleyl alcohol is a fatty alcohol.  A colorless oil, it is produced by the reduction of the carboxylic acid group in linoleic acid.

References

Fatty alcohols
Polyunsaturated compounds
Alkenols